Vincent Eugene Clark (born January 22, 1969 in Cincinnati, Ohio) is a former American football cornerback in the NFL for the Green Bay Packers, Atlanta Falcons, New Orleans Saints, and the Jacksonville Jaguars. He played college football at Ohio State University.

In 2005, Clark was named an assistant coach for the Arena Football League team the Columbus Destroyers. The head coach for the Destroyers was Chris Spielman, Clark's former teammate at Ohio State.

References

External links
 Official Profile on ESPN

1969 births
Living people
Players of American football from Cincinnati
American football cornerbacks
Ohio State Buckeyes football players
Green Bay Packers players
Atlanta Falcons players
New Orleans Saints players
Jacksonville Jaguars players